Mafoulou is a village in the Sabce Department of Bam Province in northern-central Burkina Faso. It has a population of 562.

Deposits of antimony have been reported.

References

External links
Satellite map at Maplandia.com

Populated places in the Centre-Nord Region
Bam Province